Flowerfield is an unincorporated community in Milton Township, DuPage County, Illinois, United States. Flowerfield is located near Illinois Route 53 and Wilson Avenue, between Glen Ellyn and Lombard.

References

Unincorporated communities in DuPage County, Illinois
Unincorporated communities in Illinois